= Temple Street Park =

Park in Beacon Hill, Boston, Massachusetts, U.S.

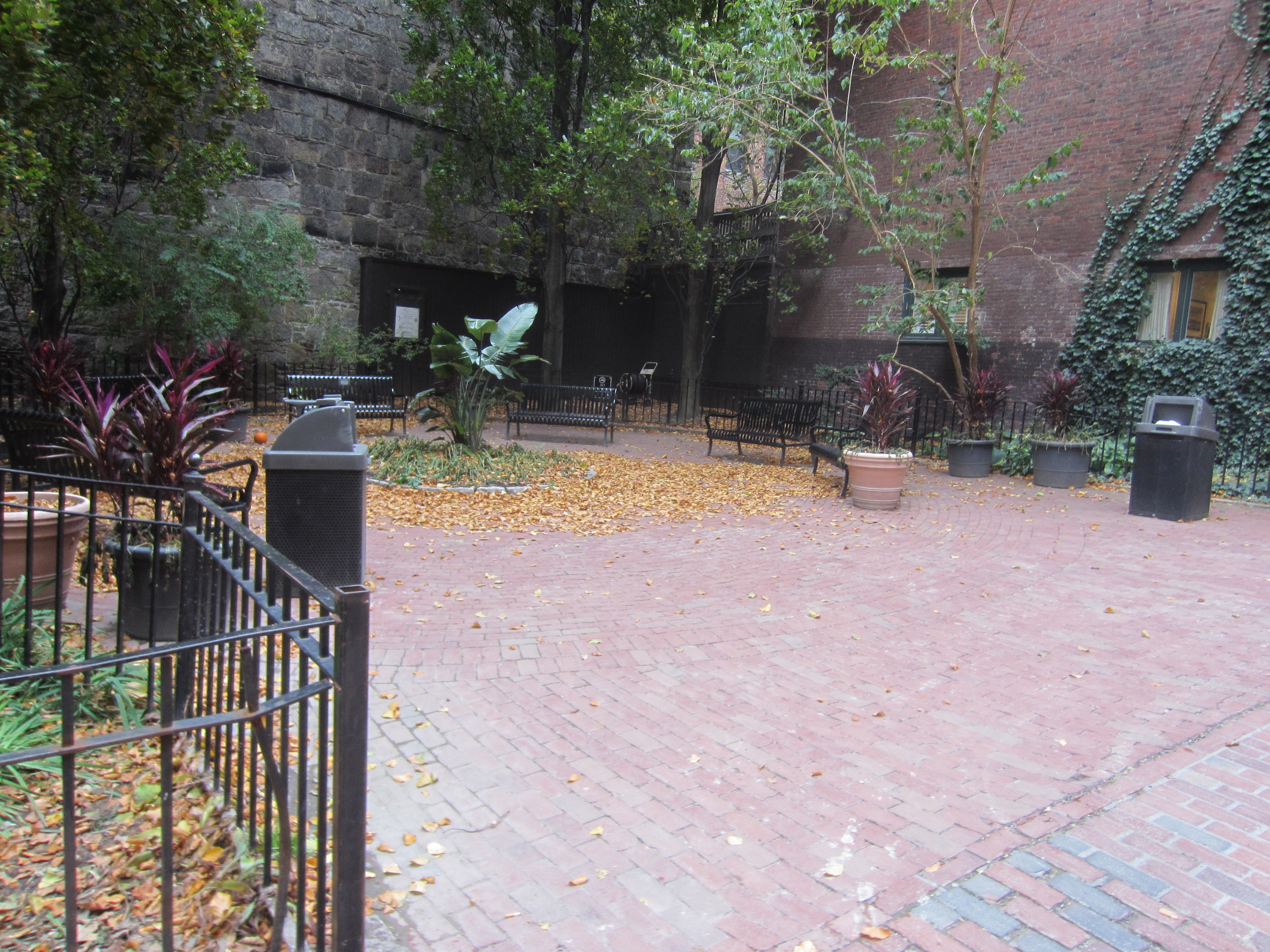
- The park in 2019

- Location within Boston
- Type: Park
- Location: Beacon Hill
- Nearest city: Boston
- Coordinates: 42°21′36.2″N 71°3′48.5″W
- Area: .06 acres (0.024 ha)
- Operator: Suffolk University

Temple Street Park is a .06-acre (0.024 ha) park in Boston's Beacon Hill neighborhood, in the U.S. state of Massachusetts. The park is owned by the City of Boston and maintained by The Friends of Temple St Park. Suffolk University reached an agreement with the Beacon Hill Civic Association, the Beacon Hill Garden Club, the City of Boston Parks and Recreation Department, and residents of Temple Street, to purchase the park in 2002. The park was then sold to the city. Suffolk, the city, and the Temple Street Association funded a renovation in 2006. The Friends of Temple St Park was formed in 2018 to help maintain and beautify this pocket park.
